Terry Porter (born August 5, 1951) is an American athlete. He competed in the men's pole vault at the 1976 Summer Olympics.

References

1951 births
Living people
Athletes (track and field) at the 1976 Summer Olympics
American male pole vaulters
Olympic track and field athletes of the United States
Place of birth missing (living people)
Universiade silver medalists for the United States
Universiade medalists in athletics (track and field)
Medalists at the 1973 Summer Universiade